Seven Types of Ambiguity is an Australian television drama series on the ABC first screened on 13 April 2017. The six-part series is based on Seven Types of Ambiguity, a 2003 novel by Australian writer Elliot Perlman.

The series is produced by Tony Ayres and Amanda Higgs and written by Jacquelin Perske, Jonathan Gavin and Marieke Hardy. It is directed by Glendyn Ivin, Ana Kokkinos and Matthew Saville. Despite being announced to premiere in 2016, it was later delayed to air in 2017.

Plot
When a seven-year-old boy (Sam) is taken from school, his parents, Joe and Anna, are frantic. The boy is returned unharmed and the police arrest the mother's ex-boyfriend Simon and then investigate his suspected accomplice Angela, who has a connection to the boy's father. Simon's psychiatrist Dr. Alex Klima, his lawyer Gina, and Joe's best mate Mitch are pulled into the entangled relationships and moral dilemmas.

Cast 
 Alex Dimitriades as Joe Marin
 Leeanna Walsman as Anna Marin
 Xavier Samuel as Simon Heywood
 Andrea Demetriades as Angela
 Hugo Weaving as Dr Alex Klima 
 Anthony Hayes as Mitch
 Susie Porter as Gina Serkin
 Sarah Peirse as Detective Staszic
 Harrison Molloy as Sam Marin

Episodes

References

Australian Broadcasting Corporation original programming
2017 Australian television series debuts
Television shows set in Melbourne
English-language television shows
Television series by Matchbox Pictures